Ken Leblanc may refer to:

Ken Leblanc (bobsleigh) (born 1968), Canadian Olympic bobsledder
Ken LeBlanc (entrepreneur) (born 1969), New Brunswick entrepreneur